Snakk Media was a mobile advertising company founded by Derek Handley, Geoffrey Handley and Andrew Jacobs in 2010 which failed.

Snakk Media listed on the New Zealand Alternative Exchange in March 2013. It moved to the new NXT index in November 2015. Since listing the share price has dropped significantly.

On the 11th of December 2018, the New Zealand Herald reported that Snakk Media had been tipped into voluntary administration, with Rahul Goyal and Scott Langdon of KordaMentha being named joint administrators. The company, according to Milford Asset Management's executive director Brian Gaynor, failed to meet expectations. It now has a market value of less than $1m.

On the 21st of December 2018, Snakk Media announced on the NXT that Mr. Joel Williams, the Chief Executive Officer, had ceased his employment as CEO of the company.

History 
Snakk Media was founded by the Handley brothers - Geoff and Derek, and Andrew Jacobs in 2010. It listed on the New Zealand Exchange in March 2013.

Snakk started its operation in 2010 with offices in Sydney, Australia. Offices were established in Melbourne in May 2012, and Brisbane in April 2013. The first Trans Tasman office was established in Auckland in May 2013 and the first Southeast Asian office in June 2013 with the opening of the Singapore office.

In May 2014 Snakk Media made a minority investment in Moasis Global of San Francisco, which includes the exclusive rights to offer its patented location-targeting technology throughout New Zealand and Australia.
Snakk has also invested in Plyfe of New York, another cloud-based ad technology platform.
 
In September 2014 Snakk Media launched a new wholly owned subsidiary, Represent Media, which sells advertising space for premium publisher titles appearing on mobile apps and websites. One of Represent Media's first customers included ESPN and later on CBS interactive.

In November 2014 - Snakk Media has been ranked New Zealand's 33rd fastest-growing business on the Deloitte Fast 50 index. This ranking was based on the company's audited year-on-year growth from the past three years, calculated at 254.05% from 1 April 2012 to 31 March 2014.

In November 2014 Snakk was ranked the 186th fastest growing technology business in the Deloitte Asia Pacific Technology Fast 500. Snakk Media also launched TV Sync, a new product which allows brands to synchronise ads across television, mobile and tablet screens. TV Sync detects a brand advertiser's TV commercial as it is broadcast in real-time, and then spams mobile social newsfeeds at the same time.

August 2015—Snakk Media launched a new division - Touch Create - a mobile-first creative business providing a range of mobile creative services to brands, media agencies and creative shops across Australia, New Zealand and Southeast Asia.

In November 2015 a subsequent Share Offer was issued and NZD $2.2 million raised.

2 February 2016 - Snakk Media announced a strategic partnership with US mobile ad tech company UberMedia to exclusively distribute its in-app social, interest, and geo-location mobile advertising products in Australia, NZ and Southeast Asia.

22 December 2016 - Mark Ryan stepped down as CEO after serving since April 2013, and was replaced by the COO Joel Williams.

In March 2016, Snakk Media was also the victim of a “whale phishing” scheme, where approximately half $1 million NZD was sent to an unknown fraudster on the basis of a fake email.

Funding 
In May 2013 Snakk Media raised $6.5 million in a share purchase plan.

In August 2015, Snakk Media came under some media scrutiny for being under capitalised and there was material uncertainty as to whether it could carry on as a going concern by its auditors Staples Rodway in its 2015 annual report. In response, the company said there "was nothing to see here" and would raise further capital.

In November 2015 a subsequent Share Offer was issued and NZD $2.2 million raised.

Recognition
Snakk Media has been certified as a "Certified B Corporation"

in 2013 as it meets the set of social and environmental performance standards set out by the non-profit organization the B Lab.

Snakk Media has also been ranked New Zealand's 6th fastest-growing business on the Deloitte Fast 50 index. This ranking was based on the company's audited year-on-year growth from the past three years, calculated at 486.3% from 1 April 2011 to 31 March 2013.
 
In December 2013 Snakk was ranked the 62nd fastest growing technology business in the Asia Pacific Technology Fast 500, one of only 16 New Zealand companies to make the top 100 on the list.

In August 2014 Snakk Media made it on to the TIN100+ Ten Hot Emerging Companies, as part of the annual TIN 100 Report measuring the performance of the technology export sector 
 
In September 2014 Snakk Media Ltd earned a place on the third annual ‘Best for Workers’ list for achieving a worker impact score in the top 10% of all Certified B Corporations.

In November 2014 - Snakk Media was ranked New Zealand's 33rd fastest-growing business on the Deloitte Fast 50 index. This ranking was based on the company's audited year-on-year growth from the past three years, calculated at 254.05% from 1 April 2012 to 31 March 2014.

In November 2014 Snakk was also ranked the 186th fastest growing technology business in the Deloitte Asia Pacific Technology Fast 500.

See also
List of mobile advertising networks
Mobile advertising

References

Software companies of New Zealand
Marketing companies established in 2010
Companies based in Auckland
Companies listed on the New Zealand Exchange